Lies that Bind  is a Kenyan television soap opera that premiered in November 2011 on the network KTN. It mainly features themes like polygamy, greed, lust, power and contemporary issues that affect families.

Plot
Lies that Bind is a Kenyan drama series that revolves around the wealthy Juma family. It majors mainly about how the love for money can destroy a family. When the head of the family, Mr. Juma, dies of a cardiac arrest, his three wives and their children, together with his conniving brother begin to fight over who gets to inherit the vast fortune left behind.

Cast

Main cast
Lucy Nyaga portrays Joyce, a good wife, the kind that will stand with a man through thick and thin, helping him build his empire. She is one that commands respect from people around her. She has a daughter named Esther.
Ruth Maingi as Salome, the third wife and Richard Juma's true love, and the third wife. She is calm, a good wife and mother. She is very soft and kind. Others like Edith treat her kindness as a weakness. She has two kids, Patricia and Allan.
Florence Nduta as Edith, the second wife and the centre of all the chaos. She is the second wife. She is extremely malicious, greedy and wants all the fortune to herself. She doesn't care who she steps on. All she wants is the rest of the family to give up on all the fortune so that she remains at the spotlight. She is also overprotective toward her son Joseph(Justin Mirichii), as she expects him to take over her late husband's empire.
Justin Mirichii as Joseph, he is a grown man, but still a mama's boy. He is lazy, undisciplined and a drunkard. He is the kind  that waits for his mother to fight for what he believes belongs to him. His mother is the one that fights for him, and fight she does. When Joseph is not fighting the rest of the family with his mother, he drinks.
Tom Osongo as John Juma a manipulative and calculating brother of Richard Juma. He has always been envious of his late brother. He has a great ambition of becoming a Member of Parliament. As his character suggests, he plays the saviour yet he is the villain.
Irene Ayimba as Esther, she is the CEO of RJ Investments. She is generally independent. She is still a bachelorette despite being the eldest on the Jumas clan.
Maureen Koech as Patricia on the other hand is the bubbly young girl in the family who is on a journey of self-discovery. She is experimental, a typical school girl trying to find her way in a world marred by family drama.

Supporting cast
Lenana Kariba as Joseph Juma
Maqbul Mohammed as Ben Juma #1
Joseph Thuo as Allan
Alan Oyugi
Eclay Wangira as Tabitha
Charlie Karumi
Oyondi Lawrence
Dantez Mwenda
Maureen Obae
May Wairimu
Stella Mungai
Olympia Owira 
Naomi Ng'ang'a as Mama Sweetie
Joseph Omari as Richard Juma
Brian Ogola as Ben Juma #2

Broadcast 
Lies that Bind premiered in Kenya at KTN on November 24, 2011. It shared same timeslot with rival soap opera Mali.

Beside airing in Kenya, it premiered in Africa at the Africa Magic Entertainment on weekdays at 6:30 PM CAT. It as also been broadcast in  Urban TV Uganda, MUVI TV Zambia, OH TV Ghana, SBC Seychelles, NBC Namibia.

Awards

References

External links

Kenyan television soap operas
2011 Kenyan television series debuts
English-language television shows
Swahili-language television shows
2010s Kenyan television series
Kenya Television Network original programming